The Presbyterian Church in Korea (TongHapBoSu) is a Reformed and Presbyterian denomination in South Korea. It subscribes to the Apostles Creed and Westminster Confession. In 2004, it had 18,309 members in 159 congregations and 199 ordained members.

References 

Presbyterian denominations in South Korea
Presbyterian denominations in Asia